Henry Mathieson Fischer (11 July 1880 – 12 June 1960) was an Australian rules footballer who played with Geelong in the Victorian Football League (VFL).

Notes

External links 

1880 births
1960 deaths
Australian rules footballers from Victoria (Australia)
Geelong Football Club players